Tarrawanna is a northern suburb of Wollongong, New South Wales, Australia, extending westward from the Princes Highway over the Illawarra Escarpment. 
Tarrawanna's main street Meadow Street has a few shops including cafes, a brewery, a Thai restaurant, a post office, a fish and chips shop and a grocer.

Education
Tarrawanna has a primary school, Tarrawanna Public School on Kendall Street.

Culture
Seminal Australian grunge band The Proton Energy Pills named its 2003 anthology "Rocket To Tarrawanna" in honour of the suburb where its members lived and met.

References

External links
http://www.environment.nsw.gov.au/resources/cultureheritage/illawarraAboriginalHistoryPoster.pdf 
https://web.archive.org/web/20080721031255/http://www.southerncouncils.nsw.gov.au/vegetation/p579.html vegetation
https://web.archive.org/web/20080720061453/http://southerncouncils.nsw.gov.au/vegetation/bellambi.htm map with vegetation marked
https://web.archive.org/web/20080606182717/http://www.wollongong.nsw.gov.au/Residents/1048.asp Tarrawanna Community Hall
http://webarchive.loc.gov/all/20090519005046/http://wcc.wollongong.nsw.gov.au/PolicyRegister/TP%2095.6%20Foothills%20View%20Estate%20Tarrawanna.pdf

Suburbs of Wollongong